Paul Young is a former Grand Prix motorcycle racer from Australia. He worked for and raced Triumph Motorcycles.

Career statistics

By season

References

External links
 Profile on motogp.com

Australian motorcycle racers
Living people
1969 births
500cc World Championship riders
Supersport World Championship riders